A skyway is a suspended covered walkway between buildings.

Skyway may also refer to:
 In air travel, a flight path common to many airline flights
 Minneapolis Skyway System, an interlinked collection of enclosed pedestrian footbridges
 Skyways Limited, a post-war British airline which became Skyways International in 1971
 Skyway Airlines based in Wisconsin, US
 SkyWay Charity based in Hackney, London, UK
 Skyway Enterprises, an airline based in Florida, US
 Skyways (Swedish airline), regional airline based in Stockholm, Sweden
 Bryn Mawr-Skyway, Washington, an unincorporated area of King County in western Washington state
 SkyWay Group, а group of companies claiming the invention of a new elevated light rail technology
 A skyway, like an aerial tram or other suspended-carriage system:
 The Jacksonville Skyway in Jacksonville, Florida, a tram (people mover)
 Skyway (Disney) in major Disney theme parks, closed in the 1990s
 Skyway (George Bush Intercontinental Airport)
 A skyway, a high road bridge or an elevated highway:
Buffalo Skyway
Burlington Bay James N. Allan Skyway
Cape Fear Skyway
Chicago Skyway
Garden City Skyway
Skyway (Metro Manila)
Pulaski Skyway
Sunshine Skyway
San Francisco Skyway
Veterans' Glass City Skyway
Skyway, a highway connecting Chico, California and Paradise, California
Skyways (TV series), an Australian television series set at an airport
 "Skyway", song by The Replacements from the album Pleased to Meet Me
 Skyway (film), a 1933 American film directed by Lewis D. Collins
 Skyway (album), a 1980 album by Skyy

See also
 Footbridge
 Pedway
 Skybridge (disambiguation)
 Flyway (disambiguation)
 Airway (disambiguation)